Pimpirev Ice Wall is the rectilinear ice slope running parallel to and some 100 m inland from the northwest coast of Emona Harbour in Livingston Island, Antarctica. Approx. 50 m high, extending from the north corner of Emona Harbour 3,700 m in west-southwest direction. Named for Christo Pimpirev, leader of the Bulgarian Antarctic campaigns during the 1993/94, 1994/95, 1995/96, and subsequent seasons, who also conducted geological field work on Alexander Island during the summer of 1987/88.

Maps
 L.L. Ivanov. Livingston Island: Central-Eastern Region. Scale 1:25000 topographic map.  Sofia: Antarctic Place-names Commission of Bulgaria, 1996.
 L.L. Ivanov et al. Antarctica: Livingston Island and Greenwich Island, South Shetland Islands. Scale 1:100000 topographic map. Sofia: Antarctic Place-names Commission of Bulgaria, 2005.
 L.L. Ivanov. Antarctica: Livingston Island and Greenwich, Robert, Snow and Smith Islands. Scale 1:120000 topographic map.  Troyan: Manfred Wörner Foundation, 2009.

References
 Pimpirev Ice Wall (historical). SCAR Composite Antarctic Gazetteer.

Ice slopes of Antarctica
Landforms of Livingston Island